Omar Caetano Otero (8 November 1938 – 2 July 2008) was a Uruguayan footballer. He represented Uruguay at the 1966 FIFA World Cup and 1970 FIFA World Cup.

He played club football with Peñarol, where he won 8 league titles, 4 major international titles and played in a record 57 derby matches against rivals Nacional. He also spent the 1975 season in the NASL with the New York Cosmos.

References

External links

NASL career stats

1938 births
2008 deaths
Uruguayan footballers
Uruguay international footballers
Uruguayan expatriate footballers
1966 FIFA World Cup players
1970 FIFA World Cup players
Uruguayan Primera División players
Peñarol players
North American Soccer League (1968–1984) players
New York Cosmos players
Expatriate soccer players in the United States
Association football midfielders